Robie Street is a north-south artery that runs for 7 km in the Halifax Peninsula area of the Halifax Regional Municipality, from Memorial Drive in the North End Halifax, to Gorsebrook Avenue in the South End.

The street and provincial road has in most places four lanes, with a centre median from Gorsebrook Avenue to Cunard Street. From Cunard to Almon Streets, it has two lanes. From Livingstone Street to Memorial Drive, it has two lanes. From Almon Street to the MacKay Bridge ramps, it has four lanes and is undivided.

Massachusetts Avenue (until May 21, 2007, it was, and commonly still is, referred to as Robie Street Extension) connects Robie Street from Livingstone Street to the MacKay Bridge. On the Halifax Peninsula street grid system, civic numbers range from 820 to 3899.

The street was named after Simon Bradstreet Robie (1770–1858), a prominent Nova Scotia judge and politician. There are also streets named after Judge Robie in Truro and Amherst, Nova Scotia.

Prior to circa 1910, Robie Street ended at North Street, with the continuation of the road to the north being part of Kempt Road, and continuing further north from Young Street as Lonegard Road. At first, Robie was mainly a residential and commercial street, but in 1882, the Nova Scotia Cotton Manufacturing Company was constructed at the intersection with Almon Street, which was followed by a series of other factories and created an industrial distinct at the north end of Robie.

Notable places
 Saint Mary's University
 Inglis Street Elementary School
 Gorsebrook Park
 Gorsebrook Junior High School
 Dalhousie University
 IWK Health Centre
 Halifax Regional Fire and Emergency Station #2  (at University Ave.)
 Nova Scotia Archives and Records Management (NSARM)
 QEII Health Sciences Centre (Camp Hill site)
 Camp Hill Cemetery
 Queen Elizabeth High School (demolished)
 Halifax Regional School Board Halifax All City Music -Adult ESL Program
 Atlantica Hotel
 The Willow Tree intersection
 Halifax Common
 CTV Atlantic and CTV 2
 Welsford Apartments
 Nova Scotia Community College Institute of Technology Campus, formerly The Nova Scotia Institute of Technology
 Highland Park Junior High School
 Halifax Regional Water Commission reservoir
 Fire Fighters Monument
 Halifax Regional Fire and Emergency Station 6
 Point North Apartments
 The George on Pepperell

Major intersections
 Inglis Street
 South  Street
 University Avenue
 Coburg Road
 Spring Garden Road
 Jubilee Road/Veterans Memorial Lane
 Quinpool Road/Bell Road/Cogswell Street (Willow Tree)
 Cunard Street
 North Street
 Almon Street
 Young Street
 Lady Hammond Road
 Leeds Street

References

Roads in Halifax, Nova Scotia